Nemanja Ilić (born 27 August 1992) is a Serbian footballer who plays as a centre back for Mladost Novi Sad.

Career
On 10 March 2021, Ilić joined FC Istiklol on trial.

References

External links
 
 
 

1992 births
Footballers from Novi Sad
Living people
Association football defenders
Serbian footballers
FK ČSK Čelarevo players
OFK Bačka players
FK Rabotnički players
FK Sloboda Tuzla players
Serbian First League players
Serbian SuperLiga players
Macedonian First Football League players
Nemanja Ilic
Premier League of Bosnia and Herzegovina players
Serbian expatriate footballers
Serbian expatriate sportspeople in North Macedonia
Serbian expatriate sportspeople in Thailand
Serbian expatriate sportspeople in Bosnia and Herzegovina
Expatriate footballers in North Macedonia
Expatriate footballers in Thailand
Expatriate footballers in Bosnia and Herzegovina